Karina Morgenstern (born 12 February 1968 in Bonn) is a German physicist. She is a professor of physical chemistry at the Ruhr University Bochum.

Education 

She studied physics and computer science at the universities of Bonn and Knoxville. She was awarded a diploma in physics in 1993 (Forschungszentrum Jülich and University of Bonn), and a diploma in computer science in 1994 (GMD Forschungszentrum Informationstechnik and University of Bonn). She then   obtained a doctoral degree in surface physics in 1996 (Forschungszentrum Jülich and University of Bonn) and completed her habilitation in experimental physics in 2002 (Free University of Berlin).

Career 

Morgenstern  was a researcher at the University of Aarhus in 1996, then at the University of Lausanne from 1996 to 1999 and at the Free University of Berlin from 1999 to 2003. She then became a professor of solid state physics at the University of Hannover in 2005 and from 2012 she was a professor of physical chemistry at the Ruhr University Bochum.
Since 2018, she has been the director of the DFG graduate school "Confinement-controlled Chemistry" and the dean of the department of chemistry and biochemistry.

Awards and fellowships 
 Günther Leibfried Prize 1997 of Forschungszentrums Jülich for an outstanding doctoral thesis.
 Hertha Sponer Prize 2002 of the German Physical Society for dynamic scanning tunneling microscopy of nanostructures, which she also dealt with in her thesis. 
 Heisenberg fellowship 2003–2005 of the Deutsche Forschungsgemeinschaft

Selected bibliography

References

External links 

Webpage of her chair in Bochum (including CV)

Living people
1968 births
University of Bonn alumni
Free University of Berlin alumni
Academic staff of Ruhr University Bochum
German women physicists
Academic staff of the University of Hanover
German expatriates in Denmark
German expatriates in Switzerland